Duncan McArthur (1885 – July 20, 1943) was an archivist, educator, civil servant and political figure in Ontario. He represented Simcoe Centre from 1940 to 1943 in the Legislative Assembly of Ontario as a Liberal.

Background
Born in Dutton, Ontario, McArthur was educated in Dutton, at Queen's University and at Osgoode Hall. He worked at the Dominion Archives of Canada from 1907 to 1912. In 1915, he was called to the Ontario bar and practised law in Toronto for two years. From 1919 to 1922, he was assistant general manager for a trust company. In 1920, McArthur married Floy Lawson. In 1922, he joined the history department at Queen's University, later serving as department head. In 1934, he became Ontario's Deputy Minister of Education.

Politics
McArthur was elected to the Ontario assembly by acclamation in 1940 following the death of Leonard Simpson. He served in the Ontario cabinet as Minister of Education from 1940 to 1943.

McArthur died of a heart attack at his summer home at Grand Bend on Lake Huron at the age of 58.

Cabinet positions

Legacy
He was the author of several textbooks and contributed to the Cambridge History of the British Empire.

Duncan McArthur Hall at Queen's University, which houses the university's Faculty of Education, was named in his honour, as was Duncan McArthur Public School, also in Kingston (now closed).

References

External links
 

1885 births
1943 deaths
Members of the Executive Council of Ontario
Ontario Liberal Party MPPs
Queen's University at Kingston alumni
Presidents of the Canadian Historical Association